The Kamchatka leaf warbler (Phylloscopus examinandus) is a species of leaf warbler (family Phylloscopidae). It was formerly included in the "Old World warbler" assemblage. It is closely related to the Arctic warbler and the Japanese leaf warbler, to which it was formerly considered conspecific.

It breeds in Kamchatka, Sakhalin, Hokkaido and the Kurile Islands; it migrates to Indonesia and the Philippines.

The first European observation about the Kamchatka leaf warbler was made on July 18, 2021, in Kilpisjärvi, Enontekiö, Finland.

References

Kamchatka leaf warbler
Birds of North Asia
Birds of Southeast Asia
Kamchatka leaf warbler